Too Many Zooz is an American music group based in New York City, consisting of Leo Pellegrino (baritone saxophone), Matt "Doe" Muirhead (trumpet) and David "King of Sludge" Parks (drums).

Formation and viral fame
Pellegrino and Muirhead met at the Manhattan School of Music, where they were attending. Pellegrino and Parks had played together in Drumadics, a local busking band.  Teaming up in mid-2013, the trio started busking together that August at various stations in the New York City Subway in their self-defined genrebrass house.

The band defines brass house as a mix of jazz, Afro-Cuban rhythms, funk, EDM and house music.

They gained fame when a video of one of their subway performances, recorded by a passerby at the Union Square station, went viral on YouTube in March 2014. They are known as well for Pellegrino's characteristic dance moves while playing.

Stage and studio
Too Many Zooz recorded an EP, F NOTE, in January 2014, which they sold at their busking performances. The band has recorded three more EPs, followed by their first full-length studio album, Subway Gawdz, on June 27, 2016, receiving mixed to positive reviews.

By January 2015, the band was booked on a tour at theatres and small clubs across the United States. They continue to tour, and played backup for Beyoncé for her televised CMA Awards performance on Nov. 2, 2016 in Nashville, Tenn.

Kaskade's July 2016 single "Jorts FTW" features Too Many Zooz.

"Warriors", from Too Many Zooz' Subway Gawdz album, was featured in Google's commercial for their Pixel 2 smart phone in October 2017. "Warriors" was also featured in the Flag Parade of the Eurovision Song Contest 2018 Grand Final.  "Brnx Bmbr" is featured in a KFC commercial for the Triple Grab N Go. "Get Busy" is also featured in the beginning credits of the Netflix original movie The Package.

Music videos 

 Bedford: (June 29, 2017) The video is the band playing on the subway train in New York City, from Bedford Avenue in Brooklyn to First Avenue in Manhattan at 3:33 in the morning.
 Car Alarm: (September 26, 2018) The music video for the song "Car Alarm" was filmed on the top of a supermarket in Philadelphia on 11th street. The video shows the Center City skyline in the background. The video consists of the band playing around a truck alarm going off.
 Trundle Manor: (October 31, 2018) The video is filmed in Trundle Manor in Pittsburgh, Pennsylvania. The video was released on Halloween as a project for the holiday. The concept is that Matt Doe is torn between good and evil in the video.
 Pink Yesterday: (December 18, 2020) The video is the band playing in Domino Park in front of the Manhattan skyline, starting with the three band members visible, while the camera slowly moves backwards to reveal an increasing number of additional musicians, until a full band is playing along.

Discography
 F NOTE (EP) (19 January 2014)
 Fanimals (EP) (6 September 2014)
 Brasshouse Volume 1: Survival of the Flyest (EP) (21 November 2014)
 The Internet (EP) (1 May 2015)
 Subway Gawdz (LP) (27 June 2016)
 A Very Too Many Zooz Xmas (EP) (19 December 2018)
 ZombiEP (EP) (September 2019)

References

External links
 
 Site on Bandcamp

Musical groups from New York City
American street performers